The Australian Stockman's Hall of Fame is a museum located in Longreach, Queensland, Australia, which pays tribute to pioneers of the Australian outback. The centre is also dedicated to Australian stockmen  who have shown bravery and courage.

The founder of the Hall of Fame was artist Hugh Sawrey, a well-known painter and former stockman, who had the name registered in 1974, put up the initial funding, and enlisted supporters. His vision was to create a memorial to the explorers, overlanders, pioneers and settlers of outback Australia. This dream was shared by other outstanding Australians, including the legendary R. M. Williams.

Longreach was chosen as the location because of its historical role as a stock route junction and because of its current transport links. The original information centre, a sandstone cottage built by R. M. Williams, complete with hand adzed timber and black marble floors, was restored to its original character and now houses the Hall of Fame's growing library collection.

In 1980, an architectural design competition was announced by the Royal Australian Institute of Architects.  Construction began in July 1985.

The Australian Stockman's Hall of Fame was opened by Queen Elizabeth II, Queen of Australia on 29 April 1988.  The structure was designed by Sydney architect Feiko Bouman and provides 2,500 m2 of usable floor space.

Gold medals once belonging to legendary sheep shearer Jackie Howe are on display.

In 2009 as part of the Q150 celebrations, the Australian Stockman's Hall of Fame was announced as one of the Q150 Icons of Queensland for its role as a "location".

See also

List of museums in Queensland
List of halls and walks of fame

References

External links
Official website
Queensland Heritage Trails
Queensland Holidays
AMOL National Guide to Collecting Institutions
Statue of a Stockman at the Australian Stockman's Hall of Fame - Images of the Outback
Australian Stockman's Hall of Fame collection on eHive

Agriculture in Australia
Halls of fame in Australia
Museums in Queensland
Awards established in 1988
Agriculture museums in Australia
Agriculture in Queensland
1998 establishments in Australia
Longreach, Queensland
Livestock in Australia